The pentecontad calendar (from πεντηκοντάς pentēkontás) is an agricultural calendar system thought to be of Amorite origin in which the year is broken down into seven periods of fifty days (a total of 350 days), with an annual supplement of fifteen or sixteen days. Identified and reconstructed by Julius and Hildegaard Lewy in the 1940s, the calendar's use dates back to at least the 3rd millennium BCE in western Mesopotamia and surrounding areas. Used well into the modern age, forms of it have been found in Nestorianism and among the Fellahin of modern Palestine.

Overview
In Akkadian, the pentecontad calendar was known as hamšâtum and the period of fifteen days at the end of the year was known to Babylonians as shappatum.

Each fifty-day period was made up of seven weeks of seven days and seven Sabbaths, with an extra fiftieth day, known as the atzeret.

Used extensively by the various Canaanite tribes of Palestine, the calendar was also thought to have been used by the Israelites until the official adoption of a new type of solar calendar system by Solomon.

The liturgical calendar of the Essenes at Qumran was a pentecontad calendar, marked by festivals on the last day of each fifty-day period such as the Feast of New Wine, the Feast of Oil, and the Feast of New Wheat.

Philo expressly connected the "unequalled virtues" of the pentecontad calendar with the Pythagorean theorem, further describing the number fifty as the "perfect expression of the right-angled triangle, the supreme principle of production in the world, and the 'holiest' of numbers".

Tawfiq Canaan (1882–1964) described the use of such a calendar among Palestinians in southern Palestine, as did his contemporary Gustaf Dalman, who wrote of the practices of Muslim agriculturalists who used Christian designations for the fiftieth day, "which in turn overlaid far more ancient agricultural practices: grape-watching, grape-pressing, sowing, etc."

Julian Morgenstern argued that the calendar of the Book of Jubilees has ancient origins as a somewhat modified survival of the pentecontad calendar.

See also
 Thursday of the Dead

References

3rd-millennium BC establishments
Amorites
Obsolete calendars
Palestinian culture
Book of Jubilees